The Alpine Elf Europa Cup is a one-make sports car racing series founded in 2018 featuring the Alpine A110 Cup.

Format 
The series consists of events in various European countries which feature two races over a weekend. Each weekend the series hosts two 25 minute races plus one lap with two separate qualifying sessions determining the grid order. Teams may run one driver over the entire weekend or split the car between two drivers with one driver running the first qualifying session and race and the other running the second.

The series supports multiple other racing series depending on the round including the International GT Open, FFSA GT Championship, and the Blancpain GT Championship.

Regulations 
Each race consists of a field of Alpine A110 Cup cars. The A110 Cup is the only eligible model in the series and very few modifications to the car are permitted. The series has two sub-categories along with the overall Drivers' Championship: Junior, for drivers under 25 years of age and Gentlemen, which is designated by the series officials but generally given to drivers over 45 years of age. At the end of the season the highest Gentleman driver in points receives an official test in an Alpine A110 GT4 racecar along with a cash prize. The highest placed Junior driver receives an official test in the Signatech-Alpine-Matmut LMP2 prototype.

Champions

References

External links 
 Alpine Elf Europa Cup official website

 
Sports car racing series
European auto racing series
Recurring sporting events established in 2018